Korku may refer to:

 Korku people, people living in India
 Korku language, their Austro-Asiatic language
 Körkü, Sungurlu